Lake Pueblo State Park is a state park located in Pueblo County, Colorado. Activities it offers include two full-service marinas, recreational fishing, hiking, camping and swimming at a special swim beach.

Lake Pueblo

Lake Pueblo is host to many water recreation activities including sailing, motor-boating, waterskiing, wakeboarding, wakesurfing, river tubing and prime fishing.

History
Pueblo Dam was constructed from 1970–1975 across the Arkansas River in Pueblo County as part of the Bureau of Reclamation's Fryingpan-Arkansas Project. While the primary purpose of the reservoir is to provide supplemental water for agricultural, municipal, and industrial uses, water from Pueblo also helps enhance recreation, fish and wildlife. Additionally, and unlike most reservoirs Reclamation constructed in Colorado, the Pueblo Dam provides for flood control because the Arkansas River has a history of flooding roughly every ten years,  the most notable of which was in 1921.

In addition to the reservoir, the Park also encompasses the Lake Pueblo Fish Hatchery and Rock Canyon Swim Beach, located just downstream of Pueblo Dam along the shoreline of the Arkansas River. Today, Lake Pueblo serves as the Fry–Ark's primary storage vessel for the lower Arkansas Valley. 
Levels in 2009 were reported as a total of 234,347 in active acre-feet storage of water.

Wildlife
The land surrounding the reservoir is very diverse. Mammals commonly sited or observed at the park include mule deer, coyote, cottontail rabbit, red fox, gray fox, beaver, raccoon, skunk, prairie dogs, and badger. It also plays home to many different reptile species bull snakes, rattlesnakes, sagebrush lizards, coach whips, and box turtles. It is notable in that it also home to a rare species of serpent, the blackneck garter snake.

Fishing

Fish here include  smallmouth bass, largemouth bass, spotted bass, walleye, crappie, bluegill, wiper, channel catfish, flathead catfish, blue catfish, rainbow trout, common carp, gizzard shad, and white suckers. Lake Pueblo is also the home of one of Colorado Department of Wildlife's hatcheries.

See also

State of Colorado
Colorado Department of Natural Resources
Colorado State Parks
List of Colorado state parks
List of lakes in Colorado
List of largest reservoirs of Colorado
List of dams and reservoirs in Colorado

References

External links

Official website
Fryingpan-Arkansas Project 50th Anniversary Film

State parks of Colorado
Protected areas of Pueblo County, Colorado
Protected areas established in 1975
1975 establishments in Colorado